"Sixth Sense" is a song recorded by South Korean girl group Brown Eyed Girls, released as the second single from the group's fourth studio album Sixth Sense in 2011. The song was covered by Lovelyz during Mnet's television program Queendom.

Background and promotion
The song is written by Kim Eana (김이나). The lyrics concern "[r]esistance for freedom of expression through music via sixth sense." The promotions of the album and song "Sixth Sense" started in September 24, on MBC's Show! Music Core and was also promoted on the shows M! Countdown, Inkigayo and Music Bank.

Accolades

Music program awards

Charts and performance
The song was released to various digital outlets in September 2011, after which it quickly topped various online charts. It topped the Gaon Digital Chart during the week ending October 1, 2011 and has sold 2,585,879+ downloads.

Weekly chart

Year-end chart

See also
 List of best-selling singles in South Korea
 List of monthly number-one songs of 2011 (South Korea)

References

External links
 Official fansite 

2011 singles
Brown Eyed Girls songs
Korean-language songs
2011 songs
Songs with lyrics by Kim Eana